Lo Tik Wan is a village on Lamma Island, the third largest island in the territory of Hong Kong.

Administration
Lo Tik Wan is a recognized village under the New Territories Small House Policy.

Economy
Lo Tik Wan is one of the 26 designated marine fish culture zones in Hong Kong.

References

External links

 Delineation of area of existing village Lo Tik Wan (Lamma North) for election of resident representative (2019 to 2022)

Villages in Islands District, Hong Kong
Lamma Island